The 276th Volksgrenadier Division was a volksgrenadier division of the German Army during World War II, active from 1944 to 1945.

History 
The division was formed in Poland on 4 September 1944, by redesignating the 580th Volksgrenadier Division, under the command of Kurt Möhring. It contained the 986th, 987th and 988th Grenadier Regiments, and the 276th Artillery Regiment.
The 580th Volksgrenadier Division had been created only a week earlier in West Prussia from the meagre remains of the 276th Infantry Division and new recruits.

The 276th Volksgrenadier Division fought in the Battle of the Bulge, where it took over two thousand casualties, including General Möhring who was killed on 18 December 1944. Möhring was succeeded by Hugo Dempwolff. It then saw action in Luxembourg, and was destroyed fighting American forces in March 1945.

Notes

References

Military units and formations established in 1944
Volksgrenadier divisions
Military units and formations disestablished in 1945